Sebastian Hartmann (born 7 July 1977) is a German politician of the Social Democratic Party (SPD) who has been serving as a member of the German Bundestag since 2013, representing the Rhein-Sieg-Kreis district. From 2018 until 2021, he also served as chairman of the SPD North Rhine-Westphalia.

Early life and career
Hartmann was born 1977 in Oberhausen and, on a scholarship of the Friedrich Ebert Foundation, studied jurisprudence without achieving an academic degree.

From 2011 until 2013, Hartmann worked in the staff of Martin Schulz.

Political career
Hartmann joined the SPD in 1993.

In the 2013 elections, Hartmann became a member of the Bundestag, representing the Rhein-Sieg-Kreis.

In parliament, Hartmann first served on the Committee on Transport and Digital Infrastructure from 2014 until 2015 before moving to the Committee on Internal Affairs. In his capacity as the SPD parliamentary group's rapporteur on integration and asylum, he was the co-author of landmark legislation aimed at regulating economic immigration and helping immigrants integrate into German society. Since the 2021 elections, Hartmann has been serving as his parliamentary group's spokesperson for internal affairs. Since 2022, he has also been a member of the Parliamentary Oversight Panel (PKGr), which provides parliamentary oversight of Germany's intelligence services BND, BfV and MAD. That same year, he joined the Commission for the Reform of the Electoral Law and the Modernization of Parliamentary Work, co-chaired by Johannes Fechner and Nina Warken.

In addition to his committee assignments, Hartmann has been a member of the German delegation to the Franco-German Parliamentary Assembly since 2019.

From 2018 to 2021, Hartmann served as chairman of the SPD in North Rhine-Westphalia, Germany's most populous state.

Other activities

Regulatory agencies
 Federal Network Agency for Electricity, Gas, Telecommunications, Posts and Railway (BNetzA), Alternate Member of the Rail Infrastructure Advisory Council (2014-2018)

Non-profit organizations
 Business Forum of the Social Democratic Party of Germany, Member of the Political Advisory Board (since 2020)
 Federal Agency for Civic Education (BpB), Alternate Member of the Board of Trustees (2018–2021) 
 IG Bergbau, Chemie, Energie (IG BCE), Member 
 German United Services Trade Union (ver.di), Member
 Workers’ Welfare Association (AWO), Member

References

Living people
1977 births
People from Oberhausen
Members of the Bundestag for North Rhine-Westphalia
Members of the Bundestag 2017–2021
Members of the Bundestag 2013–2017
Members of the Bundestag for the Social Democratic Party of Germany